Ostrovica is a village named after a small river (tributary of the Una) in the Una-Sana Canton of Bosnia and Herzegovina, located on a hill near the town of Kulen Vakuf.

In the Middle Ages, Ostrovica was a fort.

Demographics 
According to the 2013 census, its population was 11, all Bosniaks.

References

Populated places in Bihać